The Chicago Code is an American crime drama television series created by Shawn Ryan that aired on Fox in the United States. The series was filmed in Chicago, Illinois, originally airing from February 7 to May 23, 2011, with Fox announcing cancellation on May 10, 2011.

Plot
The series follows officers of the Chicago Police Department as they fight crime on the streets and try to expose political corruption within the city. Veteran Chicago Police Detective Jarek Wysocki leads the special unit fighting against the corruption.  Wysocki was assigned to head the special unit by his boss, the newly appointed first-female Chicago Police Superintendent and his one-time partner, Teresa Colvin. 

Also on the unit is Caleb Evers, a young detective and Wysocki's latest partner.  During their investigations the detectives often encounter police officers Vonda Wysocki (Jarek's niece) and Vonda's partner Isaac Joiner. Undercover officer Chris Collier, who goes by the name Liam Hennessey while undercover, works the streets as he gets information on Hugh Killian and the Irish mob and their connection to the corruption. Believed to be a source of the corruption is Alderman Ronin Gibbons, a powerful and influential politician in Chicago.

Cast

Starring
 Jason Clarke as Jarek Wysocki—a tough Chicago Polish-American homicide detective seen as a legendary figure in the department, who hates profanity, loves the Chicago White Sox, and has a hard time finding a partner who can keep up with him on the streets of the city so he has detectives who can't make "the cut" reassigned "at each other's mutual request". He and Colvin were partnered when starting out as officers, and they share a close friendship, leading her to give him the authority to take over investigations of other officers' cases.  Wysocki continues to look for the killers of his late brother who was also a Chicago police officer.  Wysocki is divorced, and engaged to a 27-year-old woman (despite the fact that he is much older), but still intimate with his ex-wife.
 Jennifer Beals as Teresa Colvin—Chicago's first female police superintendent. She is a very tough and ambitious officer, unafraid to challenge government officials or demote officers she sees as incompetent, even at the risk of making enemies in the department. In the pilot she reveals that her parents' business and marriage were destroyed by the corruption in the city, and she has made cleaning it up a personal task.
 Matt Lauria as Caleb Evers—a young homicide detective who is Wysocki's latest partner, and impresses both Wysocki (despite the fact Evers is also a Cubs fan) and Colvin with his observational skills. He is a graduate of Northwestern University and has a pending application to the Federal Bureau of Investigation.
 Devin Kelley as Vonda Wysocki—Jarek's niece and a rookie police officer. Her father was killed in the line of duty when she was a young child, and her uncle helped raise her and supported her through the police academy.
 Todd Williams as Isaac Joiner—Vonda's partner, a young and ambitious officer whose hot-shot ways lead Wysocki to worry for his niece. It is later revealed that he is Vonda's boyfriend.
 Billy Lush as Liam Hennessey—introduced as a low-level thug, later revealed to be a police officer named Chris Collier working undercover in the Irish mob.
 Delroy Lindo as Alderman Ronin Gibbons—a Chicago alderman with more than twenty years in office, widely seen as the most influential figure in the city's political machine. Colvin identifies him as the main target in her anti-corruption crusade.

Recurring
 Adam Arkin as FBI Division Chief Cuyler.
 Steven Culp as Dennis Mahoney—the mayor's chief of staff.
 Madison Dirks as Mikey—a man who works for Killian.
 Colby French as Roger Kelly—Colvin's chief of staff as appointed by Gibbons.
 John Heard as Mayor McGuinness, the mayor of Chicago.
 Brad William Henke as Ernie "Moose" Moosekian—part of the CPD's Narcotics Division 
 Warren Kole as Ray Bidwell—Colvin's driver, former Marine, and security detail.
 Patrick Gough as Will Gainey—a man who works for Killian.
 Camille Guaty as Elena—Jarek's fiancée, who breaks up with him after he tells her he is still in love with Dina.
 Shannon Lucio as Elizabeth Killian—Hugh Killian's daughter.
 Cynthia McWilliams as Lilly Beauchamp—Gibbons' secretary and lover.
 Amy Price-Francis as Dina Wysocki—Jarek's ex-wife, with whom he carries on an affair while engaged to Elena.
 Patrick St. Esprit as Hugh Killian—an Irish mob boss.
 Phillip Edward Van Lear as Ellis Hicks—Gibbons' right-hand man.

Production and cancellation
Originally titled Ride-Along, Fox green-lit the pilot in January 2010. The series was created by Shawn Ryan, who grew up in Rockford, Illinois. Regarding the setting of Chicago, Ryan said, "It's a city I'm very familiar with, and one I haven't seen photographed much, at least on TV," and that Chicago is "the center of the universe." When describing the show, he stated, "There will be a few twists that make it different from other cop shows on the air and will make it Fox-like." When under its original title and concept, Ryan described the show as "a police show in Chicago that kind of made the viewer feel as if they were in the police car with the cops." As the concept grew, the series was re-titled to The Chicago Code, saying "It became much, much more than I originally intended. It became a show that I realized I wanted to be about a lot more than just police officers. So police officers are who we use to look at the city and look at the intersection of politics and its citizenry."

Fox announced the cancellation of the series on May 10, 2011. The final episode of the series aired May 23, 2011.

About Fox's decision to cancel the show, Jennifer Beals said: "They didn’t think to look at +3s and +7s. I’m guessing. This is a guess, and it could be technologically completely inaccurate. But it was such a well-written show, and the characters were so interesting, and the pace of the show was good, and it looked really good… I don’t totally understand why they let that go."

Creator Shawn Ryan also give his thoughts about the cancellation: "I can’t say why it was canceled. I really liked the show. I thought FOX gave their best efforts to launch the show and put it in a position to succeed. We semi-succeeded, but we weren’t undeniably successful and when you aren’t undeniably successful, you are at the mercy of the executives and bean counters. I never got an answer to why the show was canceled. I certainly never got any complaints from a creative standpoint. That really was a passion project for me. To do a show that was very specific to Chicago and to sort of embrace the ethos and the way of life of those people and bring that to screen, I thought was something really exciting and jazzed me to come to work every day."

Episodes

Reception
The pilot received favorable reviews, scoring 75 out of 100 based on 25 professional reviews on Metacritic. James Queally of The Star-Ledger said that "Ryan's well-crafted characters are what truly carry the pilot, in what equates to an effective, but not groundbreaking, origin story." Noel Murray of The A.V. Club gave the pilot a B+, saying "the show, as a whole, makes great use of Chicago as a character, which in itself gives it a look and feel unlike other urban TV cop thrillers." 

IGN gave the pilot an 8.5 out of 10, noting that "Chicago Code comes off as a 'tale'. Almost as a city legend-in-the-making, with Scorsese-eque voice-overs in place, letting you know that this story, in a sense, has already happened." 

David Bianculli of NPR wrote that "[i]t borrows a little from The Wire, HBO's landmark series about entrenched, corrupted city institutions, and a little from EZ Streets, the vintage Paul Haggis cop series that gave equal weight to its good guys and its bad guys. But those are great places to start." 

Brian Ford Sullivan of The Futon Critic named the pilot episode the 13th best episode of 2011, naming it his favorite pilot of the year, and calling it "everything a television series should be: a toy box of well-rounded characters put in a distinct landscape with stories and attitudes that can be anything from funny to terrifying to heart-breaking, never knowing which is coming next".

In 2019, Padraig Cotter from Screen Rant named the show "The best cop show nobody watched" and said about it: "Considering his experience with The Shield, Ryan was obviously the right pick for a new gritty new cop show that broke away from formula. The Chicago Code had a great cast, smart writing and it found a new approach to a genre that can feel a little played out."

International broadcasts
The series aired on Global in Canada concurrently with the American broadcast. It began airing in the United Kingdom and Ireland on Sky1 on May 12, 2011.

References

External links
 

2010s American crime drama television series
2010s American police procedural television series
2011 American television series debuts
2011 American television series endings
American action television series
English-language television shows
Fictional portrayals of the Chicago Police Department
Fox Broadcasting Company original programming
Television series by 20th Century Fox Television
Television shows set in Chicago
Television shows filmed in Illinois
Works about Irish-American organized crime